Cystodictyonidae is an extinct family of bryozoans within the order Cystoporida. Members of this family have been known to live from the Ordovician to the Paleogene period.

Genera 

 †Acrogenia 
 †Cystodictya 
 †Dichotrypa 
 †Filiramoporina 
 †Lophoclema 
 †Mongolodictya 
 †Ptilocella 
 †Semiopora 
 †Stictocella 
 †Sulcoretepora 
 †Taeniopora 
 †Thamnotrypa 
 †Wysejacksonella

References 

Cystoporida
Prehistoric bryozoans
Bryozoan families
Ordovician first appearances
Paleogene extinctions